This is a list of properties and districts in Muscogee County, Georgia that are listed on the National Register of Historic Places (NRHP).

Current listings

|}

Former listings

|}

See also
National Register of Historic Places listings in Georgia

References

Muscogee

Muscogee County, Georgia